Quintus Aulius Q. f. Q. n. Cerretanus was twice consul in the Second Samnite War, first in 323 BC with Gaius Sulpicius Longus, when he had the conduct of the war in Apulia, and a second time in 319 with Lucius Papirius Cursor, when he conquered the Ferentani and received their city into surrender.

Aulius was magister equitum to the dictator Quintus Fabius Maximus Rullianus in 315, and fought a battle against the Samnites without consulting the dictator, in which he was slain after killing the Samnite general.

See also
Aulia (gens)

Footnotes

315 BC deaths
Year of birth unknown
4th-century BC Roman consuls
Magistri equitum (Roman Republic)
Cerretanus, Quintus
Ancient Romans killed in action